National Liberation Party may refer to:
National Liberation Party (Costa Rica)
National Liberation Party (Gambia)

es:Partido Liberación Nacional
fr:Parti Libération nationale (Costa Rica)
it:Partido Liberación Nacional
lt:Kosta Rikos nacionalinio išvadavimo partija
no:Partido Liberación Nacional